Born in Africa is an album produced by Philly Lutaaya and other Ugandan exiles in Sweden. The songs on the album remain ubiquitous in Uganda, and the musicians remain among the best-known Ugandan musicians.

World music albums by Ugandan artists
1990 compilation albums